Sheikh Abdullah al-Sharqawi (1737 – 1812) was an Egyptian writer and scholar of the Khalwati sufi order. He was known for being the Grand Imam of Al-Azhar during the French Campaign in Egypt and Syria, and for being one of the Leaders of the resistance against the French Occupation in Egypt, he was also one of the Three Leaders to crown Mehmet Ali Pasha in 1805.

French expedition
During Napoleon's exile at St. Helena, and when writing his diaries, he states that the Azhar University is as Equal if not more, than the Sorbonne in Paris. Napoleon looked highly upon Al-Azhar Ulama as the elite of the educated class and as the leaders of the people. When he first set foot in Cairo he formed a special council (diwan) to govern the capital. a council that consists of nine Sheikhs under the chairmanship of Sheikh Abdullah Al-Sharkawi, the grand Imam of Al-Azhar at that time. The formation of this council stands as an evidences of the importance of Al-Azhar and the high status of its Imams.

References

External links
http://www.sunnah.org/history/Scholars/mashaykh_azhar.htm#Kharashi

1737 births
1812 deaths
Al-Azhar University alumni
Grand Imams of al-Azhar
Egyptian Sunni Muslims
Egyptian scholars
Sunni fiqh scholars
Khalwati order
Egyptian Sufis
People from Sharqia Governorate